Svirce may refer to:

 Svirce (Medveđa), a village in Serbia
 Svirce (Leskovac), a village in Serbia